Nathan Andrew Green (born 13 May 1975) is an Australian professional golfer.

Born in New South Wales' second-most-populous city, Newcastle, Nathan Green turned professional in 1998. During his early career, he played mostly on the PGA Tour of Australasia, and the Canadian Tour during the Australian winter. In 2000 he won the Queensland PGA Championship in Australia, and the Benefit Partners/NRCS Classic in Canada.

Having failed to gain his PGA Tour card through the qualifying school, Green competed on the second tier Nationwide Tour in the United States in 2002, 2004 and 2005. He ended the 2005 season 18th on the money list, which enabled him to graduate directly to the PGA Tour for 2006. He finished 5th in his first event on the PGA Tour, and in his second, the Buick Invitational, he made his way into a playoff for the title against Tiger Woods and José María Olazábal, but was eliminated at the first extra hole. He finished the year ranked inside the top 50 on the money list.

Green's victory at the New Zealand Open in December 2006 raised him into the top 100 of the Official World Golf Ranking for the first time.

Green's first PGA Tour victory came at the 2009 RBC Canadian Open where he defeated Retief Goosen on the second hole of a sudden-death playoff. Green almost lost on the first hole but Goosen missed a six-foot birdie putt that would have won the tournament. On the second hole, Green missed a twelve-foot birdie putt to win the tournament but it would not matter. Goosen had to sink a nine-foot par putt to extend the playoff but he missed it, giving Green the victory.

After Green's exemption expired, he earned his PGA Tour card through Q School, but only finished 163rd on the 2012 money list. He split the 2013 season between the PGA Tour and Web.com Tour. Green has not played a PGA Tour-sanctioned event since 2015, instead choosing to compete on the PGA Tour of Australasia.

Amateur wins
1996 New South Wales Medal, (tied with Scott Gardiner and Brendan Jones)

Professional wins (4)

PGA Tour wins (1)

PGA Tour playoff record (1–1)

European Tour wins (1)

1Co-sanctioned by the PGA Tour of Australasia

PGA Tour of Australasia wins (1)

1Co-sanctioned by the European Tour

Canadian Tour wins (1)

Other wins (1)
2000 Queensland PGA Championship (Development Tour)

Results in major championships

CUT = missed the half-way cut
"T" = tied

Results in The Players Championship

CUT = missed the halfway cut
"T" indicates a tie for a place

Results in World Golf Championships

"T" = Tied
Note that the HSBC Champions did not become a WGC event until 2009.

Team appearances
Amateur
Australian Men's Interstate Teams Matches (representing New South Wales): 1995 (winners), 1996 (winners), 1997, 1998 (winners)

Professional
World Cup (representing Australia): 2007

See also
2005 Nationwide Tour graduates
2011 PGA Tour Qualifying School graduates

References

External links

Australian male golfers
PGA Tour of Australasia golfers
PGA Tour golfers
European Tour golfers
Korn Ferry Tour graduates
Golfers from Texas
Sportspeople from Newcastle, New South Wales
People from the Hunter Region
Sportspeople from Plano, Texas
1975 births
Living people